El Salvador–Venezuelan relations are the bilateral relations between El Salvador and Venezuela.

History 
In November 2019, the Venezuelan government expelled El Salvador's diplomats in a reciprocal move after El Salvador had expelled Venezuelan diplomats. El Salvador recognized opposition leader Juan Guaidó as the legitimate President of Venezuela, cutting off relations with disputed president Nicolás Maduro's government.

See also 
 Foreign relations of El Salvador
 Foreign relations of Venezuela

References 

El Salvador–Venezuela relations